The Women’s Bar Association of the District of Columbia (WBA or Association) is a voluntary bar association in metropolitan Washington, D.C. The WBA has more than 800 members and was founded in 1917.

Leadership and governance 
The WBA is led by a Board of Directors that is elected by the general membership each year. Board Members generally serve three-year terms and officers serve one-year terms. A large part of the WBA’s programming and initiative work is carried out by its numerous Committees and Forums. The Co-Chairs of the Committees and Forum organize events and networking opportunities, and support the community of women attorneys and its allies.

Programming and events 
The WBA's Committees and Forums develop and organize a wide variety of dynamic programming. WBA programs include discussions about substantive legal issues, practice development, career development, and matters of general concern to all women. These programs feature experts, authors, dignitaries, and government officials, many of whom are WBA members.

In July 2020, the WBA hosted an event called "Where are the Black Women Lawyers in Leadership Positions?" in collaboration with he Greater Washington Area Chapter, Women Lawyers Division, National Bar Association (GWAC).

The Annual Dinner is held each year in May at the National Building Museum. Typically, more than 600 people attend from a variety of practice areas, law firms, government agencies, and other professional backgrounds. The proceeds from the evening support the ongoing efforts of the WBA and the WBA Foundation.

The Stars of the Bar Fall Networking Reception hosts more than 300 people. During the event the WBA honors stars of the legal community and provides an opportunity for learning about WBA programs and services, with networking stations for each committee and forum to discuss upcoming programming in various attorney interests and fields of law.

Registration to attend WBA events is available on the WBA website.

Publications 
The WBA publishes a quarterly newsletter called "Raising the Bar" that features content produced by its membership.

Advocacy 
The WBA uses issue statements, endorsements, and initiatives to advance the interests of women lawyers. The issue statements are on topics ranging from equal pay to domestic violence to the Equal Rights Amendment. The WBA endorses executive and judicial nominees who request the support and are then vetted by the WBA.

Awards and honors 
 Janet Reno Torchbearer Award
 2016   Honorable Loretta E. Lynch
 2012   Sheila Bair
 2011   Dovey Johnson Roundtree
 2008   Justice Ruth Bader Ginsburg
 2007   Judith Areen
 2001   Honorable Wilma Lewis
 1998   Honorable Eleanor Holmes Norton
 1997   Justice Sandra Day O'Connor
 1996   Honorable Janet Reno
 Woman Lawyer of the Year Award
 2020 Jeannie Rhee
 2019 Laurie Robinson Haden
 2018 Hon Anna Blackburne-Rigsby
 2017 Ana C. Reyes
 2016 LTG Flora Darpino
 2015 Judith Scott
 2014 Judy Smith
 2013 Hon. Vanessa Ruiz
 2012 Katia Garrett
 2011 Sherri N. Blount and Debra L. Lee
 2010 Nancy Duff Campbell
 2009 Justice Elena Kagan
 2008 Mary Kennard
 2007 Kim M. Keenan
 2006 Judith Miller
 2005 Hon. Noel Anketell Kramer
 2004 Cory M. Amron
 2003 Hon. Annice M. Wagner
 2002 Carolyn Lamm
 2001 Hon. Delissa Ridgeway
 2000 Eleanor Acheson
 1999 Patricia D. Gurne
 1998 Hon. Norma Holloway Johnson
 1997 Judith Winston
 1996 Marcia Greenberger
 1995 Pauline Schneider
 1994 Justice Ruth Bader Ginsburg
 1993 Jamie S. Gorelick
 1992 Elizabeth Dole
 1992 Elaine Ruth Jones
 1992 Hon. Patricia McGowan Wald
 1992 Hon. Patricia Schroeder
 1991 Sara-Ann Determan
 1990 Hon. Judith Rogers
 1989 Judith Lichtman
 1988 Patricia Price Bailey
 1987 Betty S. Murphy
 1986 Jean Ramsay Bower
 1985 Marna S. Tucker
 1984 Hon. Patricia McGowan Wald
 1983 Hon. Gladys Kessler
 1982 Florence King
 1981 Brooksley Born
 1980 Hon. Helen Nies
 1980 Hon. Edna G. Parker
 1979 Hon. Joyce Hens Green
 1978 Jean Dwyer
 1977 Suzanne V. Richards
 1976 Ruth Hankins-Nesbitt
 1975 Hon. Roslyn Bell
 1974 A. Patricia Frohman
 1973 Margaret A. Haywood
 1973 Louise O'Neil
 1971 Margaret H. Brass
 1970 Catherine B. Kelly
 1969 Burnita Shelton Matthews
 1968 Una Rita Morris Quenstedt
 1967 Elizabeth Bunten
 1966 Hon. June L. Green
 1965 Marguerite Rawalt
 Mussey-Gillett Shining Star Award
 Stars of the Bar

References

External links

Organizations established in 1917
Organizations based in Washington, D.C.
1917 establishments in Washington, D.C.
Legal organizations based in the United States
Bar associations
Women in Washington, D.C.